Frederico Gil and Filip Prpic became the new champions, after defeating Grigor Dimitrov and Marsel İlhan 3–6, 6–2, [10–6] in the final.

Seeds

Draw

Draw

References
 Doubles Draw

American Express - TED Open - Doubles
PTT İstanbul Cup